Force One (Marathi: बळ एक, IAST: Baḷa ēka) is a specialised counter terrorism unit of the Mumbai Police to guard the Mumbai metropolitan area, one of the largest metropolitan areas in the world, formed by the Government of Maharashtra on the lines of National Security Guards (NSG). It was formed under Maharashtra Police, as a response to the 2008 Mumbai terror attacks and was commissioned two days before its first anniversary at the time of establishment Shri Jayant Patil was State Home Minister of Maharashtra. On the occasion, Maharashtra Chief Minister Ashok Chavan also laid the foundation stone of the Force One's headquarters in Mumbai. One of the primary tasks of the unit will be to protect the Maharashtra Legislature as well as several politicians within the state.

Overview

Recruitment and training 
The recruitment for Force One is undertaken among young volunteers from Maharashtra Police who are already well trained. Only around 4-5 per cent of total applicants succeed. The maximum entry age for constabulary personnel is 28 years and is 35 years for officers.

The commandos of Force One are trained at Maharashtra Intelligence Academy, the College of Military Engineering, Pune, and Defence Research and Development Organisation (DRDO), in the use of sophisticated arms and explosives, and are known for their rapid shooting skills.  While the NSG has a regional hub in Mumbai, Force One is expected to be part of the initial response to a terror strike in Mumbai.

Creation
In the wake of the 2008 Mumbai terror attacks, the Government of Maharashtra decided to form a new, specialised force to tackle terror. It was commissioned on 24 November 2009 on SRPF Ground of suburban Goregaon, Mumbai. The initial training of the unit was made under the help and supervision of Israeli Special Forces (Yamam). After two months of basic training by Israeli specialists, Force One was founded. Force One headquarters is to be spread over  inside the lush green Aarey Milk Colony at Goregaon in northwest Mumbai, and the first batch has 216 elite commandos.

Out of 3,000 applications from the state police force who volunteered to be part of the force - many of whom were part of 26/11 response team - 261 personnel were selected and trained in Pune, apart from the College of Military Engineering and the High Energy Materials Research Laboratory of the Defence Research and Development Organisation (DRDO).

Influence on other units 
The Force One have trained the police force of Mozambique. Apart from this, Force One trains all the Quick Response Teams of Maharashtra Police and are involved in training the Railway Protection Force and the Jammu and Kashmir Police.

Equipment
Weapon:
Glock 17
Glock 19
Smith & Wesson M&P
Heckler & Koch MP5
Brügger & Thomet MP9
AKM
M107 rifle
Barrett Model 98B
M4 Carbine
CornerShot
SIG SG 550
Vehicles:
Mahindra Marksman
Tata LATC
Mahindra Rakshak

See also
 Counter Insurgency Force (West Bengal)
 Special Operation Group (Odisha)
 Greyhounds (police)
 Special Operations Group (India)
 Punjab Police SWAT Team

References 

Mumbai Police
Non-military counterterrorist organizations
Maharashtra Police
Counterterrorism in India
Specialist law enforcement agencies of India
2010 establishments in Maharashtra
Government agencies established in 2010